Kalaunuiohua (nui = “great”, ohua = "servant") was a High Chief of the island of Hawaiʻi in ancient Hawaii. He was a member of the Pili line. Kalau is his short name.

Life 
Kalaunuiohua was born on Hawaiʻi (the Big Island), as a son of High Chief Kahaimoelea (Kahai IV) and his half-sister, Lady Kapo. (According to the ancient legends, he was a descendant of the handsome noble ‘Aikanaka and the Moon goddess Hina.) He succeeded his father.

The wife of Kalaunuiohua was his half-sister, Chiefess Kaheka — they had the same mother. The couple produced at least one child, Chief Kuaiwa, the successor of his father Kalaunuiohua. Kaheka later married Kunuiakanaele.

Kalaunuiohua was a famous warrior, and his battles are mentioned in the chants. One old legend tells how he was not afraid of the priests or wizards and how he ordered the killing of the witch Waʻahia, whose spirit then became united with the soul of Kalaunuiohua.

References

Hawaiian chiefs
House of Pili